The 2011 Guia Race of Macau was the twelfth and final round of the 2011 World Touring Car Championship season and the seventh running of the Guia Race of Macau as part of the World Touring Car Championship. It was held on 20 November 2011 on the Guia Circuit in the Chinese special administrative region of Macau. The race was part of the Macau Grand Prix weekend, headlined by the 2011 Macau Grand Prix Formula Three.

Both races were won by Robert Huff of Chevrolet RML.

Yvan Muller claimed his third world drivers' championship title, his second in a row. Kristian Poulsen secured the Yokohama Independent Drivers' Trophy title.

Background
Coming into the final round, Muller was leading the drivers' championship with Huff second as the only other driver in mathematical contention for the title. Poulsen was leading the Yokohama Independents' Trophy.

Yukinori Taniguchi did not take part in the round due to damage sustained at the Race of China, leaving bamboo-engineering to run a single car for Darryl O'Young. Gary Kwok replaced Colin Turkington at Wiechers-Sport, the Canadian making his debut in the series having competed in the Canadian Touring Car Championship in 2011. Having wrapped up the Jay–Ten Trophy for drivers in natural aspirated cars, Fabio Fabiani was replaced at Liqui Moly Team Engstler by local driver Jo Merszei. Four other local drivers joined the grid for the round with André Couto joining SUNRED Engineering for his annual appearance at the race, RPM Racing Team ran a BMW 320si for Mak Ka Lok and Corsa Motorsport ran a pair of Chevrolet Lacettis for Felipe De Souza and Kuok Io Keong. The 778 Auto Sport team entered an ex–Swedish Touring Car Championship Peugeot 308 for Lo Ka Chun.

Race report

Testing and free practice
The track was damp before the start of testing on Thursday, the session started half an hour late due to barrier repairs. Huff set the fastest time, beating team–mate Muller on his final lap. Charles Ng brought the red flags out when he hit the barriers at the Melco Hairpin and came to a halt. After going through scrutineering after the session, the 778 Auto Sport Peugeot was found not to comply with its original documentation from when it was run in the STCC. As a result, the team was excluded from the rest of the event.

Alain Menu led a Chevrolet 1–2–3 in the first free practice session on Friday morning, Tiago Monteiro was best of the rest in fourth.

Huff was back on top in free practice two at the head of another Chevrolet 1–2–3. Javier Villa crashed his Proteam Racing BMW 320 TC at Paiol but the session was stopped early after Fredy Barth crashed at Faraway. Having come to a stop in the middle of the track, the front of the car caught fire and once Barth was extracted from the wreckage he was taken to the local hospital for precautionary checks.

Qualifying
The two championship contenders filled the front row with Huff securing pole position for race one ahead of Muller. Robert Dahlgren topped the first session putting him tenth for race two, Franz Engstler was tenth at the end of Q1 to take pole position for the second race ahead of Michel Nykjær and Huff. Menu was the biggest name to drop out of qualifying in the first session, a late collision with Couto hindering him in the final moments. There was a confrontation between the two drivers after the session before Menu left the circuit. Barth had missed the session having been kept in hospital following his practice crash.

The second session was interrupted by a red flag when Dahlgren's Volvo crashed at the Solitude Esses, like Barth his car burst into flames shortly after the accident. Dahlgren got out of the car but required medical attention afterwards, and did not start the races. When the session resumed, Huff secured pole position having beaten Muller on both his flying laps, Gabriele Tarquini was third while O'Young was the quickest independent driver in bamboo's only car. O'Young and Nykjær were the only two Yokohama Trophy title contenders who made it through to the second session.

Warm-Up
Huff was quickest in Sunday morning's warm–up session. The session came to a close early when Aleksei Dudukalo hit the barriers at Faraway Hill before coming to a halt in the middle of the track and being hit by the Proteam BMW of Ma.

Race One
Huff started from pole position and he kept his lead at the start followed by Muller and Tarquini. Further back Couto spun at the high speed Mandarin corner and collected Menu, the safety car picked up the field at the end of the lap as the debris was cleared. The race was resumed on lap five, Monteiro went straight on down the escape road at the Lisboa corner and dropped to near the back of the field. At the same time, O'Young and Mehdi Bennani made contact and the safety car was required again. The safety car went in at the end of lap seven, on lap nine Dudukalo crashed at Moorish Hill although the race was able to continue. The narrow streets of Macau usually see very little overtaking, on lap ten there were two intra–team battles going on with Engstler getting past team–mate Poulsen to take sixth while Bennani overtook Proteam team–mate Villa for the final points paying position. Bennani moved up another place on the final lap at the expense of Pepe Oriola as Huff won the race to reduce the championship points gap by seven points to Muller who was second. Tarquini was third to take the final podium spot while Nykjær was the independents' winner in fifth.

Race Two
Engstler was on pole position while O'Young started from the pit lane. Coronel took the start from fourth at the start with Nykjær and Huff following. Huff then moved up to second place while Engstler lost another place to Muller and moved down to sixth, he was down to eighth by the second lap when he was passed by Tarquini and Michelisz. Huff passed Coronel for the lead at Lisboa on lap three while Muller closed in on Huff by taking fourth from Bennani. The safety car came out shortly after when Kwok crashed at Mandarin and brought out the safety car. The race resumed on lap six and one lap later, local drivers Mak and de Souza came together at Lisboa. Lap nine and Muller moved into the final podium place at the expense of Nykjær, two laps later Tarquini would demote the Danish driver to fifth. Huff won the second race of the day with Coronel second and Muller third who secured the drivers' title by three points. Nykjær was the independent winner once again while Poulsen claimed the independents' title.

Results

Qualifying

Bold denotes Pole position for second race.

Race 1

Bold denotes Fastest lap.

Race 2

Bold denotes Fastest lap.

 — O'Young started from the pit lane.

Standings after the event

Drivers' Championship standings

Yokohama Independents' Trophy standings

Manufacturers' Championship standings

 Note: Only the top five positions are included for both sets of drivers' standings.

References

External links
World Touring Car Championship official website

Macau
Macau Grand Prix
2011 in Macau sport
2011 in Chinese motorsport